The Saskatoon Wild Oats RFC is a Canadian rugby club based in Saskatoon, Saskatchewan. The Wild Oats Rugby Club was founded in 1973. The club has won multiple provincial titles in the Saskatchewan Rugby Union. The Wild Oats Rugby Club also has a successful women's team.

Notable players

Canada

The following players have represented Canada at full international level.

Hubert Buydens
Nanyak Dala
Kayla Mack

External links
Official Website
Official Facebook Site

References

1973 establishments in Saskatchewan
Canadian rugby union teams
Sport in Saskatoon